Mario Baffico (1907–1972) was an Italian screenwriter and film director.

Selected filmography
 The Dance of Time (1936)
 No Man's Land (1939)
 Incanto di mezzanotte (1940)

References

Bibliography
 Nina DaVinci Nichols. Pirandello and Film. University of Nebraska Press, 1995.

External links

1907 births
1972 deaths
Italian film directors
20th-century Italian screenwriters
People from Sardinia